Dawood Al Saeed (born 28 March 1991) is a Saudi Arabian football player who currently plays as a goalkeeper for Al-Hazem.

In 2020 he became the subject of a TikTok Trend, it is for this reason why he is one of the most famous goalkeepers from Saudi Arabia.

Honours
Al-Safa
Third Division: 2010–11

Al-Qadsiah
First Division: 2014–15

Al-Hazem
MS League: 2020–21

References

External links
 

Living people
1991 births
Association football goalkeepers
Saudi Arabian footballers
Al Safa FC players
Al-Qadsiah FC players
Al-Taraji Club players
Al-Nahda Club (Saudi Arabia) players
Place of birth missing (living people)
Saudi First Division League players
Saudi Professional League players
Saudi Second Division players
Saudi Fourth Division players
Saudi Arabian Shia Muslims